The National Sports Center for the Disabled (NSCD) is a 501(c)(3) non-profit organization  that began in 1970 providing ski lessons for children with amputations. Today, the NSCD is one of the largest therapeutic recreation organizations in the world, serving more than 3,000 children and adults with disabilities.  The NSCD is based out of Winter Park Resort in Winter Park, Colorado, and Sports Authority Field at Mile High in Denver, Colorado.

History 

The NSCD was founded in 1970 by Hal O'Leary, who was then a salaried ski instructor at Winter Park Resort. O'Leary taught one lesson to 23 children with amputations, which spearheaded the National Sports Center for the Disabled. For the first three years of the program, O'Leary operated out of a broom closet at Winter Park Resort.  Since then, he has been named one of the "best 100 things to happen to skiing" by Ski Magazine. has established programs for disabled athletes on four continents and coached two Paralympic teams. O'Leary was also awarded the prestigious honor of Order of Canada, Canada's highest honor of merit given to individuals recognized for lifetime achievement.  Today, the NSCD facilitates a variety of both winter and summer programs, including alpine skiing, snowboarding, Nordic skiing, snowshoeing, rock climbing, kayaking, Sports Ability Clinics and therapeutic horseback riding. The NSCD offers recreational opportunities as well as competitive ski race training through a renowned Competition Center. The NSCD is proud to be recognized as a Paralympic Sport Club through the U.S. Paralympic Sport Club Network.

Mission 

The stated mission of the NSCD: "The National Sports Center for the Disabled enables the human spirit through therapeutic sports and recreation."

Competition Center 

The Competition Center is a program designed for beginner through elite-level racers. Edging, balance drills, speed progression and gate training are all emphasized for Alpine Skiing, Cross-Country Skiing and Snowboarding competitions. The Competition Center is a smaller faction of the NSCD but provides substantial name recognition and reputation growth due to the caliber of athletes that train there, in the 2010 Winter Paralympics, the NSCD athletes accounted for more than half of the total alpine medals collected by Team USA.

Steven J. Ricci Award 

Steven J. Ricci (1968-1999) was an NSCD athlete who died following critical head injuries during a training run at Winter Park Resort. This award was created to award athletes who exemplify team leadership and sportsmanship.

2012/13 Competition Program Accomplishments (Alpine) 

Copper DSUSA NOR AM Dec 2012 2SG 2GS 2SL 
 35 medals  out of 108 possible awarded to NSCD athletes
Winter Park NOR AM Jan 2013 1 SG 1GS 1SL
 25 out of 54 possible medals awarded to NSCD athletes
Kimberley, Can NOR AM Jan 2013 2DH 2SG
 17 out of 64 possible medals awarded to NSCD athletes
US Nationals
 22 out of 54 possible medals awarded to NSCD athletes
 11 out of 18 National Champions titled to NSCD athletes
 Retained Cup for 2nd year
World Cup Highlights
 Allison Jones - 1 Gold, 3 Silver, 2 Bronze
 Alana Nichols - 1 Silver, 3 Bronze
 Danelle and Rob Umstead - 1 Gold
World Championship Highlights 
 Stephen Lawler - Silver DH
 Adam Hall - Bronze SL

2012/13 Competition Program Accomplishments (Snowboard) 

World Cup Highlights
 Mike Shea - Gold
Copper NOR AM
 Mike Shea - Gold
Sochi Test Event
 Mike Shea - Silver

2012/13 Competition Program Accomplishments (Nordic/Biathlon) 

World Cup Highlights
 Dan Cnossesn - 2 Silver, 2 Bronze
 3 top 10 international finishes
US Nationals
 Dan Cnossen - 2x National Champion
 Beth Requist - 2x National Champion

Organizational Leadership 

The Leadership Team of the NSCD is composed of six members of the organization: President/CEO, marketing director, Operations Director, Human Resources Director, Competition Center Director and Financial Director. There are 27 community members that sit on the board of trustees.

See also
Professional Association of Therapeutic Horsemanship
United States Ski and Snowboard Association

References

External links 
 NSCD website
 NSCD Facebook Page
 NSCD YouTube Channel

Parasports organizations in the United States
Non-profit organizations based in Colorado
501(c)(3) organizations
Organizations based in Denver
Canoeing in the United States
Equine therapies
Skiing in the United States
Snowboarding in the United States
Buildings and structures in Grand County, Colorado
Sports venues in Denver
Sports organizations established in 1970
1970 establishments in Colorado
Skiing in Colorado